The Utility Stores Corporation of Pakistan (USCP) is a Pakistani state-owned enterprise that operates chain stores throughout the country that provide basic commodities to the general public at prices which are lower than the open market because the government subsidizes them. It is the largest chain-store entity in the country with 5,939 locations.

Utility Stores Corporation is governed by a board of directors and headed by a managing director.

Quality assurance
Public business organizations or the public can ask courts in Pakistan to hold hearings if they have concerns about the quality of items being sold at the stores.

Performance improvement
In Khan Regime , Government of Pakistan announced the computerization of the utility stores across the country to improve their performance and efficiency. So far the stores were using old methods of recording inventory.

References

External links
Utility Stores Corporation – official website

Retail companies of Pakistan
Supermarkets of Pakistan
Government-owned companies of Pakistan
Retail companies established in 1971
Welfare in Pakistan
1971 establishments in Pakistan
Pakistani companies established in 1971
Ministry of Industries and Production (Pakistan)